Rogerson is an unincorporated community in Twin Falls County, Idaho, United States. It is located approximately 18 miles (30 kilometers) north of the Nevada border on U.S. Route 93, about seven miles east of Salmon Falls Dam. Rogerson had a post office 1910-1961.

Rogerson is part of the Twin Falls, Idaho Metropolitan Statistical Area.

See also

References

External links

Unincorporated communities in Idaho
Unincorporated communities in Twin Falls County, Idaho